Valeriya Kononenko (born 14 May 1990) is a Ukrainian racing cyclist, who currently rides for UCI Women's Continental Team . She competed in the 2013 UCI women's time trial in Florence.

Major results
2014
3rd Points race, Copa Internacional de Pista

References

External links

1990 births
Living people
Ukrainian female cyclists
Place of birth missing (living people)
European Games competitors for Ukraine
Cyclists at the 2019 European Games
Olympic cyclists of Ukraine
Cyclists at the 2020 Summer Olympics
21st-century Ukrainian women